A second-class citizen is a person who is  systematically and actively discriminated against within a state or other political jurisdiction, despite their nominal status as a citizen or a legal resident there. While not necessarily slaves, outlaws, illegal immigrants, or criminals, 
second-class citizens have significantly limited legal rights, civil rights and socioeconomic opportunities, and are often subject to mistreatment and exploitation at the hands of their putative superiors. Systems with de facto second-class citizenry are widely regarded as violating human rights.

Typical conditions facing second-class citizens include but are not limited to: 
 disenfranchisement (a lack or loss of voting rights) 
 limitations on civil or military service (not including conscription in every case) 
 restrictions on language, religion, education 
 lack of freedom of movement, expression, and association 
 limitations on the right to keep and bear arms
 restrictions on marriage 
 restrictions on housing
 restrictions on property ownership

The category is normally unofficial and mostly academic, and the term itself is generally used as a pejorative by commentators.  Governments will typically deny the existence of a second class within its polity, and as an informal category, second-class citizenship is not objectively measured, but cases such as the Southern United States under racial segregation and Jim Crow laws, the repression of Aboriginal citizens in Australia prior to 1967, deported ethnic groups designated as "special settlers" in the Soviet Union, the Apartheid regime in South Africa, women in Saudi Arabia under Saudi Sharia law, LGBT people in countries that do not allow same-sex marriage, or outright  criminalize consensual same-sex sexual relations, and Roman Catholics in Northern Ireland during the Parliamentary era are all examples of groups that have been historically described as having second-class citizenry and being victims of state-sponsored discrimination. Historically, before the mid-20th century, this policy was applied by several European colonial empires on colonial residents of overseas possessions.

A resident alien or foreign national, and children in general, fit most definitions of a second-class citizen. This does not mean that they do not have any legal protections, nor do they lack acceptance by the local population, but they lack many of the civil rights commonly given to the dominant social group. A naturalized citizen on the other hand essentially carries the same rights and responsibilities as any other citizen, except for possible exclusion from certain public offices, and is also legally protected.

Relationship with citizenry class

Examples
 Adults under the age of 21 in many places in the United States are not legally allowed to purchase certain goods or services including but not limited to hotel/motel rooms, tobacco, cannabis, alcohol, firearms, and use of casinos.
 Proposals for a U.S. guest worker program—which would provide legal status to and admit foreign workers to the U.S., but provide no path to citizenship for them—has been criticized on the ground that such a policy would create second-class non-citizens.
 Latvian non-citizens constitute a group similar to second-class citizens. Although they are not considered foreigners (they hold no other citizenship, have Latvian IDs), they have reduced rights compared to full citizens. For example, non-citizens are not eligible to vote or hold public office. The European Commission against Racism and Intolerance has described their status as making "people concerned feel like “second-class citizens”. Estonian non-citizens are in a similar position.
 New Zealanders receive automatically a "Special Category Visa" upon entering Australia, which presents no pathway to Australian citizenship. New Zealanders are denied access to Centrelink, to name just one of the services. This means that if, for example, a New Zealand person came to Australia to live with their Australian spouse, and that spouse committed domestic violence upon them, the New Zealander could not then turn to Centrelink to provide them with funds to leave the abusive spouse.
 In Malaysia, as part of the concept of Ketuanan Melayu (lit. Malay supremacy), a citizen that is not considered to be of Bumiputera status face many roadblocks and discrimination in matters such as economic freedom, education, healthcare and housing.
 Mainland Chinese citizens who are settling in Hong Kong or Macau by means of a one-way permit do not have citizenship rights (such as obtaining a passport) in both the mainland or the SAR after settling but before obtaining the permanent resident status, effectively rendering them second-class citizens.
 Special permanent resident (特別永住者) is a type of Japanese resident with ancestry usually related to its former colonies, Korea or Taiwan. They have usually afforded additional rights and privileges beyond those of normal Permanent Residents, but still unable to vote in Japanese elections.
 The British Nationality Act 1981 reclassified the British national classes as British Overseas Territories citizen, British Nationals (Overseas) and British Overseas citizens in addition to the British citizens. Martin Lee of Hong Kong claimed it is "One country, six citizenships". The creation of British Nationals (Overseas) (BNO) class was satirized as "British NO" by some Hong Kong media. Despite its status as a British national, holders do not have the right of abode in the United Kingdom, with its application and status similar to a general Commonwealth citizen of other sovereign countries.
 Burakumin (部落民) is a designation of Japanese Second-class status meaning the people who are from a place called a "buraku." “Buraku” basically means a village or small district. For a long time, people have discriminated against people from a "buraku" even though they belong to the same race, and there are no differences between ordinary Japanese people and people who are called burakumin. It is not clear when and why this started, but it is said that it was most common in the Edo period. They are often called eta (穢多) or hinin (非人) meaning polluted or not a human. Even though in Meiji 4 (1871), this discrimination was officially ended by kaihourei (解放令), many people resisted it and continued treating them as burakumin. Today, fewer people are discriminate towards burakumin, however, the term burakumin is still recognized as a discriminating word while there are certain amount of recent young generations who do not even know the term and idea of burakumin. Also, in some cases, people still happen to be discriminated against, especially when they get a job or get married. These cases often reported as problems.

See also
Blacklisting
Dégradation nationale
Involuntary unemployment
Loss of rights due to felony conviction

References

Class discrimination
Equality rights
Human rights abuses
Injustice
Political terminology
Religion and politics
Social inequality
Social groups
Citizenship